The following is a list of newspapers in the Democratic Republic of the Congo.

List of publications

Defunct

See also
 Media of the Democratic Republic of the Congo
 Democratic Republic of the Congo literature

References

This article incorporates information from the French Wikipedia and Lingala Wikipedia

Bibliography

in English
 
 
 

in French

External links
 
 
 
 

congo, Democratic Republic